KINE-FM (105.1 MHz "Hawaiian 105 KINE") is a commercial radio station licensed to Honolulu, Hawaii. It is owned by SummitMedia and it broadcasts a Hawaiian adult contemporary radio format.   The studios and offices are on Fort Street near Nimitz Highway in Downtown Honolulu.

KINE-FM has an effective radiated power (ERP) of 100,000 watts horizontal polarization and 81,000 watts vertical.  The transmitter is off Palehua Road on Palikea Ridge in Akupu.  KINE-FM is also heard on Oceanic Spectrum digital channel 855 for the entire state of Hawaii.

History

Early years
It was owned by RLS Radio with studios on Bishop Street. It started with a classic hits format, which changed to classic rock by the early 1990s.

It switched to a Traditional Hawaiian Adult Contemporary format in 1992 to compete against Hawaiian Top 40 100.3 KCCN-FM.  KINE-FM was later purchased by then KCCN-FM owner B.J. Glascock and the two became sister stations in 1993.  KCCN-FM aims at younger Hawaiian listeners while KINE-FM aims a bit older.

KINE target 25-54 listeners of Hawaiian descent, done in an adult-appeal presentation.  It plays Hawaiian songs from the 1970s, 1980s and 1990s. This direction distinguishes KINE-FM from co-owned KCCN-FM, which plays more youthful Top 40/CHR-style Hawaiian music.  For many years, KINE-FM was co-owned with KKNE 940 AM, which aimed at 35-64 listeners and played older Traditional Hawaiian hits.  KKNE went silent in December 2022.

Changes in ownership
In 2000, KINE-FM was acquired by Cox Media, Inc.  Cox is based in Atlanta and owns radio and television stations, cable systems and newspapers.

On July 20, 2012, Cox Radio announced the sale of KINE-FM and 22 other stations.  They were being sold to Summit Media LLC for $66.25 million. The sale was consummated on May 3, 2013.

On June 20, 2014, KINE-FM changed its online streaming to a subscription service.  The subscription requirement ended a few years later and KINE-FM can be heard on its website.

Past personalities
Original staff members were Sam Kapu (Morning Show 6am-10am), Dukie D (Program Director and afternoon drive time 3pm-7pm), Charly Espina, PJ the DJ (12am-6am), "Bruddah Wade" Faildo (producer for Sam Kapu and weekend jock who would eventually become full-time announcer and Promotions Director) and Lisa D (7pm-12am, older sister to PJ the DJ).  Popular veteran radio personality Billy V was brought on at Hawaiian 105 KINE in 2007 from KCCN-FM where he started with that station in 2000.  He succeeded Brickwood Galuteria who ran for political office in the Hawaii State Legislature and become one of the senior members of the Hawaii Senate.

In 2013, "Mento Mele" Apana joined Billy V in mornings and the radio show was renamed "Naʻau Therapy".  The show officially ended on December 1, 2015.  Billy V later worked in mornings on Hawaii News Now Sunrise.  They were succeeded by two personalities who are also longtime radio veterans: Dave Lancaster and "Sistah Sherry" Clifton.

Other notable past personalities on Hawaiian 105 KINE-FM included Randy Hudnall, Brickwood Galuteria, Noe Tanigawa and Frank B. Shaner.

References

External links
KINE official website

INE-FM
Hawaiian-music formatted radio stations
Radio stations established in 1990
1990 establishments in Hawaii
Mainstream adult contemporary radio stations in the United States